Al Ras Public Library (aka the Dubai Central Public Library) is the oldest library in Dubai, UAE, opened in 1963. It is located in Al Ras, Deira.

Al Ras Public Library was the first public library in Dubai, inaugurated by Sheikh Rashid bin Saeed Al Maktoum in 1963. The library includes more than 100,000 books in a number of languages and over 170 periodicals. The library has an activity room, audio-visual facilities, a reading hall, and a separate section for children's literature.

The library announced that it was closing for renovation work in September 2019.

The nearest Dubai Metro station is Al Ras on the Green Line.

Nowadays, the library is one of a number of Dubai Public Libraries.

See also
 Dubai Public Library
 Mohammed Bin Rashid Library

References

1963 establishments in the Trucial States
Libraries established in 1963
Libraries in Dubai